"" is a popular mezzo-soprano aria from Camille Saint-Saëns's opera Samson and Delilah, known in English as "Softly awakes my heart", or more literally "My heart opens itself to your voice". It is sung by Delilah in act 2 as she attempts to seduce Samson into revealing the secret of his strength.

Music
In the opera, Delilah is responding to Samson's words "" (Delilah! Delilah! I love you!) which he repeats between the first and second verses of her aria; these interjections are omitted in recital performances or sometimes sung to the changed words ""; Samson's part in the final 22 bars of the stage aria where he joins Delilah in a duet is also omitted in a recital, although some performers, notably Marilyn Horne and Jessye Norman, have sung Samson's final words – changed as above, rising to a high B-flat. A performance takes between 5 1/2 and 6 1/2 minutes.

The aria is notated in D-flat major with time signatures of 3/4 for the verse and common time (4/4) for the refrain (""); the tempo indication is andantino (=66) for the verses and un poco più lento (a little slower) for the refrain. The vocal range extends from B-flat3 to G-flat5, with a tessitura from E-flat4 to E-flat5.

The instrumentation calls for flute, oboe, English horn, clarinet, horns, harp and strings. All instrument lines, except the harp, make intensive use of divisi (cellos play in four divisi). The orchestral accompaniment consists mainly of reiterated notes for the first verse and of falling chromatic lines for the second verse; the refrain is accompanied by ascending broken chords.

The melismatic setting of the lyrics present a particular challenge for the performance of this aria as it requires legato singing over a wide range.

Lyrics

In modern music

The aria had several incarnations in the 20th century. The first version was called "Mine and Mine Alone" and was put out by Steve Lawrence in 1952. The song was written by Sid Tepper and Roy C. Bennett..
  
The aria's melody appears in the song "Night", written by John Lehmann and Ron Miller and performed in 1960 by Jackie Wilson.

Julie Andrews and Italian-American tenor Sergio Franchi sang this aria in duet on the 17 February 1973 ABC TV broadcast of The Julie Andrews Hour.

Countertenor and performance artist Klaus Nomi performed the aria at his first performance, and recorded a version with electronic instrumentation on his self-titled debut album.

Run–D.M.C.'s Joseph Simmons' rendition of this song appears on the 1997 album The Rapsody Overture: Hip Hop Meets Classic, a collection of hip hop songs intertwined with classical vocals and music.

A montage of the last two lines of this aria has been recorded by English alternative rock band Muse, and is included in the track titled "I Belong to You (+)" of their 2009 album The Resistance.

References

External links

Audio file: "Mon cœur s'ouvre à ta voix" sung by Louise Homer. Recorded October 11, 1909.
 , sung in French by Elīna Garanča; Metropolitan Opera 2018–19, Great Performances
 , sung in Italian by Renata Tebaldi

Opera excerpts
Mezzo-soprano arias
Compositions by Camille Saint-Saëns
1877 compositions
Arias in French
Compositions in D-flat major